The national symbols of Hungary are flags, icons or cultural expressions that are emblematic, representative or otherwise characteristic of Hungary or Hungarian culture. The highly valued special Hungarian products and symbols are called Hungaricum or Hunnerisms.

Flags and heraldry

The flag of Hungary is a horizontal tricolor of red, white and green. The coat of arms of the Árpád dynasty is also popular.

Flora and fauna

Almost a fifth of the country is forested, however only 10 percent is natural forest. Hungary is home to some 2,200 flowering plant species and, because of its topography and transitional climate, many of them are not normally found at this latitude. Much of the flora in the Villány and Mecsek Hills in Southern Transdanubia, for example, is usually seen only around the Mediterranean Sea. On the southern Szársomlyó Hill of the Villány Mountains, the formerly unknown Colchicum hungaricum' (Hungarian Crocus) was found and botanically described in 1867 by the Hungarian botanist Viktor Janka. This is the earliest [native?] Hungarian flower to bloom.

The saline Hortobágy region on the Eastern Plain has many plants normally found on the seashore, and the Nyírség area is famous for meadow flowers. The Gemenc forest on the Danube River near Szekszárd, the Little Balaton in the center of Transdanubia, and the Tisza River backwater east of Kecskemét are important wetlands. Most of the trees in the nation's forests are deciduous beech, oak, and birch, and a small percentage are fir. Since the 14th century, over 250 new plants have colonized Hungary, of which almost 70 are considered invasive.  Many such plants are perennial herbs that have slowly extirpated some native flora.

Historically, Hungary was the second largest supplier of paprika to the United States, despite the spice not being a product of a Hungarian native plant. Hungarian paprika has a distinctive flavor and is in great demand in Europe where it is used as a spice rather than as a coloring agent.

People

National Anthem
"Himnusz" was adopted in the 19th century and the first stanza is sung at official ceremonies. The words were written by Ferenc Kölcsey, a nationally renowned poet in 1823, and its currently officially recognised musical setting was composed by romantic composer Ferenc Erkel in 1844, although other, lesser known musical versions exist.

Food and drink

The traditional Hungarian dishes abound in piquant flavors and aromas. Dishes are flavorful, spicy and often rather heavy. Flavors of Hungarian dishes are based on centuries-old traditions in spicing and preparation methods. The exquisite ingredients are produced by local agricultural and husbandry. Paprika, onion and garlic are to be found everywhere. In the Middle Ages the fish soup was the most popular and the most lovely fishmeal in Hungary. A cookery book from 1860 contains 400 fish recipes. The most well-known specialities of Hungarian cuisine such as goulash soup, the different varieties of stew and paprikás'' are red with paprika.

See also

Hungary
List of Hungarian dishes
Ópusztaszer National Heritage Park

References

 
Hungarian culture